The K League 'FAN'tastic Player is an annual award given to the player who is judged to have been the best of the year in South Korea. The word 'Fan'tastic means that a fanstasic player is chosen by fans. The award has been presented since the 2009 season and the winner is chosen by an online poll by K League fans.

Winners

See also
 K League
 K League MVP Award
 K League Top Scorer Award
 K League Top Assist Provider Award
 K League Manager of the Year Award
 K League Young Player of the Year Award
 K League Best XI
 K League Players' Player of the Year

References

External links
 All-time winners at K League 
 History at K League 

K League trophies and awards
2009 establishments in South Korea
Awards established in 2009
Annual events in South Korea